This list of botanical gardens and arboretums in Wyoming is intended to include all significant botanical gardens and arboretums in the U.S. state of Wyoming

See also
List of botanical gardens and arboretums in the United States

References 

 
Arboreta in Wyoming
botanical gardens and arboretums in Wyoming